Aldo Notari (September 6, 1932July 26, 2006) was the president of the International Baseball Federation from 1993 to 2006.

References

Baseball executives
2006 deaths
Sportspeople from Parma
1932 births
Italian baseball players